Susanne Brück  (née Messner, born 30 November 1972) is a German football midfielder who played for VfR 09 Saarbrücken. She also played three international matches for Germany. She was part of the team at the UEFA Women's Euro 1991 and UEFA Women's Euro 1993.

References

1972 births
Living people
German women's footballers
Germany women's international footballers
Place of birth missing (living people)
Women's association football midfielders
UEFA Women's Championship-winning players